Wael Ayan (born June 13, 1985 in Aleppo, Syria) is a Syrian footballer. He currently playing for Kolkata's club Mohammedan. He plays as a midfielder, wearing the number 14 for the Syrian national football team.

International career

Appearances in major competitions

Honour and Titles

Club
Al-Ittihad Aleppo
Syrian League: 2005.
Syrian Cup: 2005, 2006.
AFC Cup: 2010.

National Team
Nehru Cup:
Runner-up (2): 2007, 2009

References

External links
 Profile at theplayersagent.com
 
 

1985 births
Living people
Sportspeople from Aleppo
Syrian footballers
Syria international footballers
Association football midfielders
Syrian expatriate footballers
Expatriate footballers in Saudi Arabia
Syrian expatriate sportspeople in Saudi Arabia
Expatriate footballers in the United Arab Emirates
Al-Ittihad Aleppo players
2011 AFC Asian Cup players
Al-Faisaly FC players
Najran SC players
Al-Ittihad Kalba SC players
Footballers at the 2006 Asian Games
UAE Pro League players
Saudi Professional League players
Asian Games competitors for Syria
Syrian Premier League players
Calcutta Football League players
21st-century Syrian people